Land of Men is a Canadian short drama film, directed by Ky Nam Le Duc and released in 2009. The film centres on José Maria (Jorge Martinez Colorado), an undocumented immigrant from Mexico who is detained in Quebec by police officers Catherine (Rosa Zacharie) and Patrick (Hugues Saint-Louis).
 
The film premiered in June 2009 at the CFC Worldwide Short Film Festival, where it won the award for Best Canadian Short Film. It was a Genie Award nominee for Best Live Action Short Drama at the 30th Genie Awards in 2010.

References

External links

2009 films
2009 short films
Canadian drama short films
Films shot in Quebec
Quebec films
French-language Canadian films
2000s Canadian films